{{DISPLAYTITLE:C14H12O3S}}
The molecular formula C14H12O3S (molar mass: 260.31 g/mol, exact mass: 260.0507 u) may refer to:

 Suprofen
 Tiaprofenic acid

Molecular formulas